Rockin' thru the Rockies is a 1940 short subject directed by Jules White starring American slapstick comedy team The Three Stooges (Moe Howard, Larry Fine and Curly Howard). It is the 45th entry in the series released by Columbia Pictures starring the comedians, who released 190 shorts for the studio between 1934 and 1959.

Plot
The Stooges are guides (circa late 1800s), who are helping a trio christened "Nell's Belles" travel across the Rocky Mountains to San Francisco, the location of their next performance. While preparing some corned beef, a group of Native Americans urges them to get off their land as soon as possible. Since Curly accidentally scared off the horses earlier, the group is stuck there for the night.

During the night, Moe and Larry angrily tell Curly to sleep by himself because he is barking like a dog in his sleep. Unfortunately, snow falls while they sleep. They awake to discover a bear has devoured their food supply, so the three hapless guides try unsuccessfully to catch some fish in a nearby frozen lake. The fishing expedition is interrupted by Nell (Kathryn Sheldon), who discovers the Belles — Lorna Gray, Dorothy Appleby and Linda Winters — have been abducted by that same tribe. The Belles manage to escape, and the troupe leaves the Native American land quickly.

Production notes
Rockin' thru the Rockies was filmed on November 7–11, 1939. The film title is often mistaken for the 1945 feature film Rockin' in the Rockies starring the Stooges.

After the snow collapses the tent-like structure from the set of "Uncle Tom's Cabin" (in which the troupe performs in a traveling show), Curly falls through a curtain, lands on the girls in bed, and says, "The walls of Jericho collapsed." This is a reference to a scene in Columbia's It Happened One Night, where the flimsy barricade set up between Claudette Colbert and Clark Gable in a motor lodge was called the "walls of Jericho."

The name of the troupe, "Nell's Belles," is a play on the old expression "Hell's Bells," which of course would not have been permitted by the Production Code.

In this short Curly also briefly chants, "Give 'em the axe, give 'em the axe; right in the neck, right in the neck" which is a reference both to the Stanford Axe as well as the chant traditionally shouted by Stanford during the Big Game, which was popular in southern California during the early part of the 20th century.

The conclusion of this film is reminiscent of Early American folklore as the Stooges leave Indian territory a la Windwagon Smith.

References

External links 
 
 
Rockin' Thru the Rockies at threestooges.net

1940 films
The Three Stooges films
American black-and-white films
Films directed by Jules White
1940 comedy films
Columbia Pictures short films
American slapstick comedy films
1940s English-language films
1940s American films